Johannisberg is the name of the following:

Mountains:
 Johannisberg (Bad Nauheim)
 Johannisberg (High Tauern) (3,453 m AA), in the Glockner Group in the Austrian High Tauern
 Johannisberg (Jena-Lobeda) on the east bank of the Saale near Jena-Lobeda, with bronze-age and early medieval fortifications
 Johannisberg (Oberpfalz) (605 m) in the Upper Palatine Forest near Freudenberg (Oberpfalz)
 Johannisberg (Teutoburger Wald) in the Teutoburg Forest
 Johannisberg (Wuppertal) in Wuppertal

Places:

 in Germany
 Johannisberg (Geisenheim), part of Geisenheim in Rheingau-Taunus-Kreis in Hesse 
 Johannisberg (Oberviechtach), part of Oberviechtach in Landkreis Schwandorf in Bavaria
 Johannisberg (Penzberg), part of Penzberg in Landkreis Weilheim-Schongau in Bavaria
 Johannisberg (Windhagen), a village in the municipality of Windhagen in Rhineland-Palatinate
 Johannisberg (Gammelby), a village in the municipality of Gammelby in Kreis Rendsburg-Eckernförde (Schleswig-Holstein)
 in Poland
 Borzęcino, a village in the voivodeship of Westpommern (formerly Johannisberg im Landkreis Schlochau, Pommern); see Biały Bór
 Grębice, a village in the voivodeship of Westpommern (formerly Johannisberg im Landkreis Cammin, Pommern); see Świerzno, West Pomeranian Voivodeship
 Jania Góra, a village in the voivodeship of Kujawien-Pommern (formerly Johannisberg im Landkreis Schwetz, Westpreußen); see Świekatowo
 Janowa Góra, a village in the voivodeship of Niederschlesien (formerly Johannisberg im Landkreis Habelschwerdt, Niederschlesien)
 Janowo, a village in the voivodeship of Ermland-Masuren (formerly Johannisberg im Landkreis Osterode, Ostpreußen)
 Lubkowice, a village in the voivodeship of Westpommern (formerly Johannisberg im Landkreis Kolberg-Körlin, Pommern); see Gościno
 Osetna, a village in the voivodeship of Lebus (formerly Johannisberg im Landkreis Soldin, Brandenburg); see Lipiany
 in Romania
 Johannisberg, the German name for Nucet village, Roşia Commune, Sibiu County
 in Slovenia
Johannesberg, the German name for Janževa Gora, Municipality of Selnica ob Dravi
 in Sweden
 Johannisberg (Sweden)
 in the Czech Republic
 Janov nad Nisou, municipality in okres Jablonec nad Nisou in Isergebirge

Castles:
 Jánský vrch in Javorník, Bohemia
 Johannisberg Castle (Düdelingen), a ruined castle on the Johannisberg near Düdelingen in Luxembourg
 Johannisberg Castle, a castle site in the Rheingau

Viticulture:
 Schloss Johannisberg, a winery in the Rheingau
 Johannisberg Region of the Reingau vineyards
 Johannisberg (Lößnitz), a former vineyard in Saxony
 Radebeuler Johannisberg, part of the Lößnitz vineyard
 in Switzerland a name for the Silvaner grape

See also
 Johannesburg (disambiguation)
 Johannesberg (disambiguation)
 Johannisburg (disambiguation)